Weni Anggraini (born 16 October 1990) is an Indonesian doubles specialist badminton player from Jaya Raya Jakarta club.

Achievements

BWF Grand Prix 
The BWF Grand Prix had two levels, the Grand Prix and Grand Prix Gold. It was a series of badminton tournaments sanctioned by the Badminton World Federation (BWF) and played between 2007 and 2017.

Mixed doubles

  BWF Grand Prix Gold tournament
  BWF Grand Prix tournament

BWF International Challenge/Series 
Mixed doubles

  BWF International Challenge tournament
  BWF International Series tournament

Performance timeline

Individual competitions 
 Senior level

References 

1990 births
Living people
Sportspeople from Jambi
Indonesian female badminton players
20th-century Indonesian women
21st-century Indonesian women